Trenton Academy was a private school in the city of Trenton, New Jersey from 1781 to 1884 that served children ages 4–16.  It was located on Academy Street where the Trenton Public Library is presently located.

History

In 1781 prominent members of the Trenton community created a company promoting the cause of education in the city.  It was organized as a stock company and the board of trustees were elected annually from the stockholders.  By 1785, the school was formally named Trustees of Trenton Academy.  After 1789 the school issued a certificate under the seal of the corporation to scholars which studied the English language grammatically and gained competent knowledge of at least 2 branches of Extraction of the Roots, Algebra, Mathematics, Geography, Chronology, History Logic Rhetoric, Moral and Natural Philosophy, Spirit of Laws and Criticism, the students also read, what is usually read in schools: Caesars Commentaries or Ovid's Metamorphoses, Justin or Sallust in Latin and any two of the four following books, The New Testament, Lucian's Dialogue, Xenophon or Homer in Greek.

During the late 1790s, the Academy held a lottery to raise money.  In 1800, they leased part of the Presbyterian church ground on State street for a girls' school.  The Trustees of the Academy passed a resolution prohibiting the students from shooting guns within the limits of the school in the year 1807.  In the winter of 1815-1816, the Academy was used by the Methodist church to hold one of the first Sunday schools in the country. The school flourished for many years as a notable institution in Trenton New Jersey.  Many statesmen and notable citizens attended the institution.

In 1847 a new building was erected and the trustees reduced the tuition.  By 1870 the principal of the academy was George R Grosvenor.  The Trustees were Thomas J Stryker, Gregory Anthony Perdicaris, Barker Gummere, Philemon Dickinson, and John S. Chambers.  By the year 1881, the school contained nineteen students and after 103 years around 1884, the school closed, currently the lot where the Trenton Academy once stood is now the Trenton Public Library.  There is a plaque on the library describing the Trenton Academy.

Trustees

Notable alumni
Charles Conrad Abbott
William L. Dayton 
William Lewis Dayton Jr. 
Thomas Story Kirkbride, 1809-1883
Ion Hanford Perdicaris, 1847-1855 
Samuel R. Gummere
William S. Gummere
John Storey Chambers
Joseph L Naar
Washington Roebling
J. Hart Brewer
Charles Skelton
Daniel Bailey Ryall
Gershom Mott
William E Hoy
James Hoy Jr.

References

Buildings and structures in Trenton, New Jersey
National Register of Historic Places in Trenton, New Jersey
Educational institutions established in 1781
1781 establishments in New Jersey
Educational institutions disestablished in 1884
1884 disestablishments in New Jersey